Portuguese Legion may refer to: 
Portuguese Legion (Napoleonic Wars), 1808–1813, military unit serving in concert with the forces of Napoleon
Legião Portuguesa (Estado Novo), paramilitary state existing from 1936–1974
Loyal Lusitanian Legion, 1808, a unit of the British Army, composed of Portuguese volunteers.